WDR 5 is a German public radio station owned and operated by the Westdeutscher Rundfunk (WDR).

History

WDR 5 went on air on October 7, 1991 on the former frequencies of WDR 1 as the new North Rhine-Westphalia wave. At that time, the old WDR 1 program was initially continued from 6:00 a.m. to 1:00 p.m.

External links
Official website (in German)

Westdeutscher Rundfunk
Radio stations in Germany
Radio stations established in 1991
1991 establishments in Germany
Mass media in Cologne